Danny O'Hagan (born 24 April 1976 in England) is an English footballer.

Career

After being released from Plymouth Argyle at the end of 1996/97, O'Hagan played Sunday league football with The Albemarle. However, he returned to the club in November 1997 due to a shortage of attacking options and started in a 3–0 win over Bournemouth.

References

External links
Danny O'Hagan at Soccerbase

1976 births
Living people
English footballers
Association football forwards
Plymouth Argyle F.C. players